The Last Mixed Tape is an Irish-based daily music blog founded in February 2014 by critic and journalist Stephen White. The site is composed of reviews, interviews, and news features all written by White, specifically about the Dublin music scene. Although the site is listed as a blog, White has on several occasions distanced himself from the term, preferring to be called a "critic".

The website promotes and critiques the artists coming out of Ireland's independent scene, spanning several genres including indie, electronic, post punk, noise pop and alternative rock.

Writing style and criticism
Although White champions Irish indie music, he has been known to be harder on pop acts coming out of the country resulting in a controversial rant about Irish act Kodaline in which he likened them to "vanilla ice-cream". This has continued to earn the Last Mixed Tape a controversial reputation within the Irish music scene with White's reviews of The Coronas album 'Trust The Wire' and The Strypes album 'Spitting Image' being seen as unfair. The Last Mixed Tape continued to earn a negative reputation following a review of the Script's Freedom Child album, which was described as "toxic" and left "a bad taste".

Awards and nominations
Since its first year the Last Mixed Tape was nominated for six music blogging awards, the Blog Awards Ireland in 2014, 2015, 2016 & 2018 and at the Web Awards Ireland in 2014, 2015 & 2016, losing out on all occasions.

Appearances and events
The Last Mixed Tape has also taken part in several events and charity shows around Dublin. Stephen White has appeared on several panel discussions representing the blog, including multiple appearances at Vinyl & Wine and an appearance at the State.ie of the Nation Address.

In May 2015 Stephen appeared as part of a discussion panel at Life Festival, speaking about Nas and his debut album Illmatic. White also guested as a host on weekly radio show the Co-Present alongside Fight Like Apes singer MayKay.

In September 2014 White along with several promoters from the Dublin area ran a charity night for the Irish Red Cross to raise funds for their appeal to help victims of the 2014 Israel-Gaza conflict. The night was headlined by local rock 'n' roll band the Minutes. In May 2015, the Last Mixed Tape took part in an event at Whelan's (music venue) to raise funds for the Yes Equality campaign during the Thirty-fourth Amendment of the Constitution (Marriage Equality) Bill 2015. This was followed by another charity gig in September 2015 in aid of Irish Red Cross Migration appeal during the European migrant crisis.

In 2019 Stephen was announced as one of the judges for the Choice Music Prize Album of the Year 2018.

Podcast
In 2015 the Last Mixed Tape began a weekly music review podcast. The show is uploaded every Friday morning and features White reviewing Irish indie albums and singles and is hosted by local Irish DJ Kate Brennan-Harding who is a producer for the Irish national and independent radio station, Today FM. Sara Lovic took over as co-host from January 2018 to present.

References

External links 
 the Last Mixed Tape Facebook
 the Last Mixed Tape Twitter

Irish music websites
Music blogs